9th NYFCO Awards
December 13, 2009

Best Film: 
 Avatar 
The 9th New York Film Critics Online Awards, honoring the best in filmmaking in 2009, were given on 13 December 2009.

Top 11 films
(in alphabetical order)
Adventureland
Avatar
Fantastic Mr. Fox
The Hurt Locker
Inglourious Basterds
The Messenger
Precious
A Serious Man
Two Lovers
Up
Up in the Air

Winners
Best Actor:
Jeff Bridges - Crazy Heart as Bad Blake
Best Actress:
Meryl Streep - Julie and Julia as Julia Child
Best Animated Film:
Up
Best Cast:
In the Loop
Best Cinematography
Inglourious Basterds - Robert Richardson
Best Debut Director:
Marc Webb - (500) Days of Summer
Best Director:
Kathryn Bigelow - The Hurt Locker
Best Documentary Film:
The Cove
Best Film:
Avatar
Best Film Music or Score:
Crazy Heart - Steve Bruton, T-Bone Burnett and Jeffrey Pollack
Best Foreign Language Film:
The White Ribbon • Germany
Best Screenplay:
Quentin Tarantino - Inglourious Basterds
Best Supporting Actor:
Christoph Waltz - Inglourious Basterds as Col. Hans Landa
Best Supporting Actress:
Mo'Nique - Precious as Mary
Breakthrough Performer:
Christoph Waltz - Inglourious Basterds

References

New York Film Critics Online Awards
2009 film awards
2009 in American cinema